Prolactin-releasing peptide (PrRP) is a peptide hormone that in humans is encoded by the PRLH gene.  PrRP stimulates prolactin (PRL) release and regulates the expression of prolactin through binding to the prolactin-releasing peptide receptor (GPR10).

Description
PrRP has 20 amino acids, and is a member of the RFamide peptide family.

During the discovery process, PrRP was found to be a ligand for an orphan G-protein coupled receptor (GPR 10). Preliminary in vitro studies showed it to stimulate the secretion of prolactin from lactotropic cells, hence its name. Now, however, the function of PrRP in the brain is understood in terms of negative regulation of appetite.

PrRP is produced by noradrenergic neurons A1 and A2 in the solitary nucleus, and also by neurons in the hypothalamus.

References

Further reading